Michael John Crawley  (born 1949) is a British Emeritus Professor of Plant Ecology at Imperial College London. He is based at Silwood Park campus near Ascot, Berkshire.

His research focuses on the relationship between plants and their herbivores, and on the way that alien plants modify plant community dynamics.

Publications
Crawley has been author or co-author of several books and many scientific papers. These include:

 Clive A. Stace and Michael J. Crawley 2015 Alien Plants New Naturalist Library Book 129. William Collins ISBN 978-000750215-8 640pp

References

Living people
Fellows of the Royal Society
Academics of Imperial College London
British ecologists
1949 births